Nashawena may refer to:

 Nashawena Island, one of the Elizabeth Islands in Gosnold, Massachusetts
 USS Nashawena (AG-142), a U.S. Navy cable ship